Khalaj Rud (also Romanized as Khalaj Rūd; also known as Chāleh Jārū, Halāchārū, and Ḩalachrūd) is a village in Khezel-e Gharbi Rural District, in the Central District of Kangavar County, Kermanshah Province, Iran. At the 2006 census, its population was 291, in 70 families.

References 

Populated places in Kangavar County